Titanobochica is a monotypic genus of pseudoscorpion in the family Bochicidae. It contains the single species Titanobochica magna, a cave-dwelling pseudoscorpion native to caves in the Algarve region of Portugal.

Description
Titanobochica magna is unpigmented and does not have eyes. Like all members of its family, it is venomous.

Distribution and habitat
The species is endemic to caves of the Algarve karstic massif.

References

Pseudoscorpion genera
Endemic arthropods of Portugal
Monotypic arachnid genera
Bochicidae